The Type 95 torpedo was a torpedo used by submarines of the Imperial Japanese Navy during World War II.

The Type 95 was based on the Type 93 torpedo (Long Lance); its mod 1 had a smaller  and mod 2 had a larger  warhead size than the Type 93's . The Type 95 was similar to the U.S. Navy's contemporary Mark 16 hydrogen peroxide torpedo, which had a shorter range, slightly higher top speed and a larger and nearly twice as powerful war head at 580 Kilograms filled with TORPEX or HBX/HBX-3 Explosive.  It was intended to be fired from a standard  torpedo tube of a submerged submarine.

which was about three times the range of the U.S. Navy Mark 14 at the same speed when using longer range and 45 to 47 knots.

The Type 95 was the fastest torpedo in common use by any navy during World War II. Its warhead size was the largest of any submarine torpedo, and second only to the Type 93 used by Japanese surface ships. Its engine was a kerosene-oxygen wet-heater rather than the compressed air used by most torpedo types at the time.

References

Bibliography
 Boyne, Walter J. Clash of Titans. 1995, Simon and Schuster. .

Torpedoes of Japan
World War II weapons of Japan
Attack on Pearl Harbor
World War II naval weapons